Al-Nairyah Club is a Saudi Arabian football club based in Al Nairyah, Eastern Province and competes in the Saudi Second Division, the third tier of Saudi football. The club was founded in 1977 and its current president is Mohammed Al-Mutairi. Al-Nairyah won their first promotion to the Saudi Second Division during the 2020–21 season after reaching the semi-finals of the Saudi Third Division. The club also consists of two other departments, table tennis and volleyball.

Current squad 
As of 1 August 2021:

References

External links

Football clubs in Saudi Arabia
Football clubs in Eastern Province, Saudi Arabia
1977 establishments in Saudi Arabia
Association football clubs established in 1977